This is a list of adult fiction books that topped The New York Times Fiction Best Seller list in 1978.

See also

 New York Times Nonfiction Best Sellers of 1978
 1978 in literature
 Lists of The New York Times Fiction Best Sellers
 Publishers Weekly list of bestselling novels in the United States in the 1970s

References

1978
.
1978 in the United States